The basketball tournament at the 1975 Mediterranean Games was held in Algiers, Algeria.

Medalists

Men's Competition

References
1975 Competition Medalists

Basketball
Basketball at the Mediterranean Games
International basketball competitions hosted by Algeria
1975–76 in European basketball
1975 in African basketball